Umudlu or Umutlu may refer to:
Umudlu, Agdam, Azerbaijan
Umudlu, Tartar, Azerbaijan
Umudlu (Sarov), Tartar, Azerbaijan